Skurken i Muminhuset, or Villain in the Moominhouse, is a picture book from 1980 by the Finnish author Tove Jansson. The final Moomin story written by Jansson, the story revolves around a mysterious nocturnal visitor to the Moominhouse, who sets the house and its inhabitants into disarray.

Unusually, the book used photographs in lieu of illustrations. These were taken by Tove Jansson's brother, Per Olov Jansson, and were set in and around the large model of the Moominhouse built by Tove Jansson and her partner Tuulikki Pietilä. The house and the models of the Moomins and their friends used in the books are now on display at the Moomin Museum in Tampere.

English edition
Although published in Swedish and Finnish, the book has never been published in English.

The first official translation of Villain in the Moominhouse by Tove Jansson historian Ant O'Neill was premiered in a reading at the ArchWay With Words literary festival on 25 September 2017.

References

External links 
 Archway with words

1980 books
Moomin books
Books of photographs